Longgang is a town under the jurisdiction of Yandu District, Yancheng, in northeastern Jiangsu province, People's Republic of China.

Geography
It administers 31 village-level divisions.

External links
Government of Longgang

Township-level divisions of Jiangsu
Yancheng